Pharr-San Juan-Alamo (PSJA) Memorial Early College High School is a public high school in Alamo, Texas (U.S.). It is part of the Pharr-San Juan-Alamo Independent School District and is one of the district's six high schools.

Located at 800 South Alamo Road, the school serves students in grades 9th through 12 grade.  The principal is Raquel Garcia.

Student demographics
The demographic breakdown by race/ethnicity of the 1,812 students enrolled for the 2018–2019 school year was:

Attendance area and feeder patterns
The school's attendance boundary includes most of Alamo as well as parts of San Juan, and the census-designated place of North Alamo.

Feeder elementary schools include Farias, Marcia Garza, Guerra, Santos Livas, John KcKeever, Reed Mock, and Sergeant Trevino. Feeder middle schools include Alamo and Audie Murphy.

Notable alumni 
 Rossy Evelin Lima – Mexican-American poet

References

External links
 
 Pharr-San Juan-Alamo Independent School District

Pharr-San Juan-Alamo Independent School District high schools
Public high schools in Texas